Leopoldo Toniolo (1833–1908) was an Italian painter, mainly of genre themes.

Toniolo was born in Schio, Province of Vicenza, but had moved to Padua by 1861. El me ama, was exhibited in 1880  in Turin, along with a canvas depicting: An Antiquarian. In Milan in 1881, he exhibited: Repose of the Odalisque, In 1887 in Venice, he exhibited In aspettazione della solita partita. He also painted portraits both contemporary, such as a young Malmignati Leoni, and historical, such as Portrait of Petrarch.

References

1833 births
1908 deaths
People from Schio
19th-century Italian painters
Italian male painters
20th-century Italian painters
Italian genre painters
Painters from Vicenza
19th-century Italian male artists
20th-century Italian male artists